The 2001 Canoe Sprint European Championships were held in Milan, Italy.

Medal overview

Men

Women

Medal table

References

External links
 European Canoe Association

2001
2001 in Italian sport
Sprint European Championships
Canoeing and kayaking competitions in Italy
Sports competitions in Milan